Ken Bishop (born September 8, 1990) is a former American football defensive tackle in the National Football League (NFL) for the Dallas Cowboys. He also was a member of the Toronto Argonauts in the Canadian Football League (CFL). He was drafted by the Dallas Cowboys in the seventh round of the 2014 NFL Draft. He played college football at Northern Illinois.

Early years
Bishop attended Piper High School. As a senior, he earned second-team All-state honors. He received invitations to the North-South All-Star Game and the Dade-Broward All-Star Game in 2009.

He enrolled at Ellsworth Community College, where as a freshman he tallied 64 tackles (third on the team), 2 sacks and a fumble recovery. The next year, he registered 67 tackles (second on the team), 2 sacks and a pass defensed in 9 games played.

In 2012, he transferred to Northern Illinois University. As a junior, he posted 55 tackles (eighth on the team) and 2 sacks (sixth on the team), while starting 9 out of 14 games, including one at fullback in the MAC Championship contest. 

As a senior, he recorded 70 tackles (fourth on the team), 7 tackles for loss (tied for fourth) and 2 interceptions. In 27 games he finished with 125 tackles (16.5 for loss), 3.5 sacks and 2 interceptions.

Professional career

Dallas Cowboys
Bishop was selected by the Dallas Cowboys in the seventh round (251st overall) of the 2014 NFL Draft. He took part in three of the first four games of the season, while the team dealt with injuries to Anthony Spencer and DeMarcus Lawrence. On October 18, he was waived to make room for linebacker Keith Smith. On October 21, he was re-signed to the practice squad. On January 10, 2015, he was promoted to the active roster for the playoff game against the Green Bay Packers, because of injuries to the defensive line.

In 2015, he appeared in 2 games (was declared inactive for 2) without registering a tackle. On October 5, he was released to make room for suspended defensive end Greg Hardy.

Toronto Argonauts
On May 25, 2016, he was signed by the Toronto Argonauts of the Canadian Football League. He appeared in 16 games (15 starts), posting 31 tackles (3 for loss), 3 sacks, one forced fumble and 2 passes defensed.

In 2017, he played sporadically due to injuries. He recorded 6 tackles in 5 games (4 starts) separated by several stints on the injured list. He missed the 105th Grey Cup game with an injury, which the Argonauts won.

On February 6, 2018, the Argonauts signed Bishop to a one-year extension. Bishop provided depth on the defensive line, starting while teammate Dylan Wynn was suspended during week 6, or injured. He appeared in 16 games, collecting 18 tackles and 2 sacks. 

On February 22, 2019, Bishop re-signed with Toronto. He was released on August 23. He appeared in 7 games, tallying 11 tackles and one sack.

References

External links
 Northern Illinois bio

1990 births
Living people
Players of American football from Fort Lauderdale, Florida
Players of Canadian football from Fort Lauderdale, Florida
American football defensive tackles
Canadian football defensive linemen
American players of Canadian football
Ellsworth Panthers football players
Northern Illinois Huskies football players
Dallas Cowboys players
Toronto Argonauts players
Piper High School (Florida) alumni